The 2018–19 HockeyAllsvenskan season is the 14th season that the second tier of Swedish ice hockey has operated under that name. The series consists of 14 teams playing a regular season in which each team plays each other team four times, twice at home and twice away. This is followed by a series of promotion and relegation tournaments, with the teams finishing first through eight participating in promotion playoffs, and the teams finishing 13th and 14th forced to requalify to avoid relegation to the Hockeyettan.

Participating teams

Regular season

Standings

Note: IK Pantern decided to withdraw from the league on 31 May 2019, due to financial problems.

Post-season

Finals
The top two teams from the regular season will meet in a best-of-five tournament, with the winner advancing directly to the SHL qualifiers, and the losing team forced to play an additional playoff.

AIK vs. IK Oskarshamn

HockeyAllsvenskan playoffs
Teams 3–8 from the regular season will play a single round-robin tournament, with teams 3–5 getting home-ice advantage. The season is then over for all but the winning team, which advances to the meet the loser of the HockeyAllsvenskan finals in a playoff to the SHL qualifiers.  Teams also started with bonus points based on their position in the regular season standings. Team 3 began with three points, team 4 with two points, and team 5 with one point.

Playoff to the SHL qualifiers
In the playoff to the SHL qualifiers, the losing team from the HockeyAllsvenskan finals will meet the winning team from the HockeyAllsvenskan playoffs in a best-of-three series. The winning team will advance to the SHL qualifiers.

AIK vs. Leksands IF

SHL qualifiers
Two teams from the HockeyAllsvenskan and two teams from the SHL played a best-of-seven series, with the winners qualifying for play in the 2019–20 SHL season and the losers qualifying for play in the 2019–20 HockeyAllsvenskan season. The winner of the HockeyAllsvenskan finals met team 14 from the SHL, while the winner of the playoff to the SHL qualifiers met team 13 from the SHL. Mora IK and Leksands IF faced each other for the third consecutive year, in these qualifiers.

For the first time since 2013 and for the first time since the current SHL qualifier format was introduced in 2015, both SHL teams (Timrå IK and Mora IK) failed to re-qualify for the SHL and thus were relegated. IK Oskarshamn and Leksands IF qualified for the SHL by winning their respective series. IK Oskarshamn promoted to the top-tier league for the first time in the club's history.

Timrå IK vs. IK Oskarshamn

Mora IK vs. Leksands IF

HockeyAllsvenskan qualifiers
Teams 13 and 14 from the regular season will defend their spots in HockeyAllsvenskan in the HockeyAllsvenskan qualifiers. 

Note: Almtuna IS, despite their sporting relegation, were offered and accepted IK Pantern's spot in HockeyAllsvenskan, after Pantern decided to withdraw from the league in May 2019 due to that club's financial struggles.

References

Allsvenskan
Sweden
HockeyAllsvenskan seasons